Camp Sloggett in Koke'e State Park near Kokee, Hawaii, is a historic site with significance from 1921.  It is within state lands but has buildings owned by the Kauai Young Women's Christian Association.

It was listed on both the Hawaiʻi Register of Historic Places and the National Register of Historic Places (NRHP) on August 5, 1993.  The NRHP listing included one contributing building and one contributing structure, as well as four non-contributing buildings and structures.

It was deemed significant "as a surviving example of camp architecture from the early 1920s and for its associations with the Sloggett family and the YWCA."  The Kauai YWCA took ownership in 1964 and tried to run it as a traditional YWCA-type camp providing one or two week camp experiences for children;  this proved unworkable and the YWCA since operated it as a fee-for-services camp available to various groups.

References 

National Register of Historic Places in Kauai County, Hawaii
Buildings and structures completed in 1921
1921 establishments in Hawaii
Protected areas established in 1993
YWCA buildings
Sloggett
Hawaii Register of Historic Places
History of women in Hawaii